Al-Irsyad Mosque is a mosque located in West Bandung, West Java, Indonesia, within Kota Baru Parahyangan housing complex. The mosque was built in 2009 and completed in 2010.  The mosque is shaped as a cube, without a dome. The architects of the mosque are Ridwan Kamil, an architect turned politician who is currently the governor of West Java.

See also
 Islam in Indonesia
 List of mosques in Indonesia

References

Further reading

  Tjokrosaputro, Teddy (2011). 100 Beautiful Mosque Indonesia. Jakarta: PT Andalan Media. .

2010 establishments in Indonesia
Religious buildings and structures in West Java
Mosques completed in 2010